Areopagus was the supreme court in ancient Athens.

Areopagus may also refer to:

Areopagus sermon, delivered there by the Apostle Paul
Areopagus (poetry), a 16th-century literary movement
Areopagus of Eastern Continental Greece, a regional government during the Greek War of Independence
Court of Cassation (Greece), the modern Greek supreme court

Areopagite (a person from the Areopagus) may refer to:
Dionysius the Areopagite, a Christian saint of the 1st century
Pseudo-Dionysius the Areopagite, a Christian philosopher of the 5th–6th century